The Spring Arts & Heritage Centre (known as the Havant Arts Centre until 2009) is an arts centre in Havant, Hampshire, England.

Containing a small theatre (135 seats), the arts centre is used for professional and amateur theatre, music of all kinds, dance, to show films and for community groups to meet. It is a regular performance venue for the following partner groups: Bench Theatre Company, Havant Light Opera, HumDrum Theatre Company, and Havant Dynamo Youth Theatre.

It is also the base for the music project charity, Music Fusion (the trading name of Fusion Plus, a Charity Registered in England and Wales no: 1128586).

The centre is run by The Spring Arts & Heritage Centre Company (registered in Wales 20888483), which is a Registered Charity. (Registration Number 297353).  Funding comes from the state via Hampshire County Council and Havant Borough Council.

The centre director from 2003 to 2012 was Amanda O'Reilly. The current centre director is Sophie Fullerlove.

References

External links

Swifts need farm dung for survival | Home | Bordon Herald

Arts centres in England
Buildings and structures in Hampshire
Havant